The Anecdote is the debut studio album by South Korean rapper E Sens. It was released on August 27, 2015, by Beasts And Natives Alike.

Background 
The album's first single, "Back In Time", was released September 30, 2014. The album was scheduled to be released in November 2014, but it was delayed because he was arrested for marijuana use, in November.

After his release from prison, he was arrested again in 2015 on marijuana charges. But the album was not delayed due to the label's request, the album was released in August 2015 while he was in prison. The album was a success, garnering unprecedented pre-sale orders and winning both Album of the Year and Best Rap & Hip Hop Album at the 2016 Korean Music Awards.

Track listing 
All tracks written by E Sens and produced by Daniel "Obi" Klein, except for track 9 "Tick Tock" written by E Sens and Kim Ximya.

Charts 
Album chart usages for Oricon

References

2015 debut albums
E Sens albums
Korean-language albums